Przy Bażantarni Street is a street in the Ursynów district of Warsaw, Poland.

History
The name of the street comes from pheasantry, which is a non-existent object, and was established during the reign of King John III Sobieski. It was supposed to make hunting more attractive (together with the zoo).

In the years 1780–1782, August Czartoryski built a classicist palace in the place of the Pheasantry, designed by Szymon Bogumił Zug. The palace was rebuilt many times, and in the 19th century the name was changed from Bażantarnia to Natolin to commemorate Natalia Potocka.

More important objects
 The Church of Blessed Ladislas of Gielniów (3 Przy Bażantarni Street), erected in 1988
 János Esterházy Monument (3 Przy Bażantarni Street)
 A complex of sports facilities built as part of the Orlik 2012 program (a football field and a multi-functional volleyball and basketball field with a sanitary and changing room building; opened on December 12, 2008, the cost of the 1.5-month construction was PLN 2 million). On March 2, 2010, Polish and Hungarian delegations, headed by Prime Ministers Donald Tusk and Gordon Bajnai, played on this pitch;
 Przy Bażantarni Park (between Przy Bażantarni and Jeżewskiego Streets), established in 2008–2011.

References

Streets in Warsaw
Ursynów